The Dr. Urban Owen House is a property in College Grove, Tennessee that was listed on the National Register of Historic Places in 1988.

According to a 1988 study of Williamson County historical resources, the house is a "good example" of a "house with vernacular designs with fine Eastlake and Queen Anne decoration" and associated with a prominent resident of Williamson County.

References

Houses on the National Register of Historic Places in Tennessee
Houses in Williamson County, Tennessee
Victorian architecture in Tennessee
Side passage plan architecture in the United States
Houses completed in 1873
National Register of Historic Places in Williamson County, Tennessee